The 2016 World Junior Curling Championships were held from March 5 to 13 at the Tårnby Curling Club in Copenhagen, Denmark.

Men

Teams

Round-robin standings
Final Round Robin Standings

 is not able to be relegated due to their hosting of the 2017 World Junior Curling Championships, so therefore the next lowest ranked team,  is relegated to the 2017 "B" Championships

Round-robin results
All draw times are listed in Central European Time (UTC+01).

Draw 1
Sunday, March 6, 14:00

Draw 2
Monday, March 7, 9:00

Draw 3
Monday, March 7, 19:00

Draw 4
Tuesday, March 8, 14:00

Draw 5
Wednesday, March 9, 9:00

Draw 6
Wednesday, March 9, 19:00

Draw 7
Thursday, March 10, 14:00

Draw 8
Friday, March 11, 9:00

Draw 9
Friday, March 11, 19:00

Playoffs

1 vs. 2
Saturday, March 12, 14:00

3 vs. 4
Saturday, March 12, 14:00

Semifinal
Saturday, March 12, 19:00

Bronze-medal game
Sunday, March 13, 14:00

Final
Sunday, March 13, 14:00

Women

Teams

Round-robin standings
Final Round Robin Standings

Round-robin results
All draw times are listed in Central European Time (UTC+01).

Draw 1
Sunday, March 6, 9:00

Draw 2
Sunday, March 6, 19:00

Draw 3
Monday, March 7, 14:00

Draw 4
Tuesday, March 8, 9:00

Draw 5
Tuesday, March 8, 19:00

Draw 6
Wednesday, March 9, 14:00

Draw 7
Thursday, March 10, 9:00

Draw 8
Thursday, March 10, 19:00

Draw 9
Friday, March 11, 14:00

Tiebreaker
Saturday, March 12, 09:00

Relegation Tiebreaker
Saturday, March 12, 19:00

 is therefore relegated to the 2017 World Junior B Curling Championships

Playoffs

1 vs. 2
Saturday, March 12, 14:00

3 vs. 4
Saturday, March 12, 14:00

Semifinal
Saturday, March 12, 19:00

Bronze-medal game
Sunday, March 13, 9:00

Final
Sunday, March 13, 9:00

References

External links

World Junior Curling Championships
World Junior Curling Championships
International sports competitions in Copenhagen
World Junior Curling Championships
Curling competitions in Denmark
World Junior Curling Championships
World Junior Curling Championships
2016 in Copenhagen